Sean Kennedy (born 24 April 1991) is a Scotland 7s international rugby union player. His regular playing position is scrum-half. On 7 August 2019 he signed a one year partnership contract with Glasgow Warriors which will also allow him to play with Super 6 side Stirling County.

Rugby Union career

Professional career

Kennedy played for Pro14 side Edinburgh from 2011 until he was released in 2019. For the 2012–13 season he was on loan to Glasgow Warriors.

International career

Kennedy has represented Scotland Under 20 in the 2011 IRB Junior World Championship and Scotland 7s on the 2012 HSBC World Series.

In 2013 Kennedy was named in the Scottish national team for the 2013 Six Nations Championship.

Kennedy received a call up to the senior Scotland squad by coach Gregor Townsend on 22 May 2017 for the summer tour.

References

External links
ESPN Profile
Scotland Rugby Profile

1991 births
Living people
Alloa RFC players
Edinburgh Rugby players
Glasgow Warriors players
London Irish players
Male rugby sevens players
Rugby union players from Limerick (city)
Rugby union scrum-halves
Scotland international rugby sevens players
Scottish people of Irish descent
Scottish rugby union players
Stirling County RFC players